Margaret Sweeney may refer to:

Margaret M. Sweeney (born 1955), American judge
Margaret Sweeney (swimmer) (born 1929/1930), New Zealand swimmer

See also
 Margaret Campbell, Duchess of Argyll, also known as Margaret Sweeny